The Dominican Republic at the Pan American Games.

Medal count

References

External links
 - Comité Olímpico Dominicano Official site.